Edward Lowth Badeley  (1803 or 1804 – 1868) was an English ecclesiastical lawyer and member of the Oxford Movement who was involved in some of the most notorious cases of the 19th century.

Early life
Born 1803 or 1804, Edward was the younger son of the medical doctor John Badeley and his wife, Charlotte née Brackenbury of Chelmsford. He graduated with second-class honours from Brasenose College, Oxford, in 1823 with a Bachelor of Arts in classics and took his Master of Arts degree in 1828. He was called to the bar by the Inner Temple in 1841.

He started to practise on the home circuit but was attracted by ecclesiastical law. Badeley had met John Henry Newman in 1837 and become a follower soon after. He soon became associated with his fellow Anglo-Catholic lawyers James Hope-Scott and Edward Bellasis in defending Tractarianism.

In 1848 he appeared for the objectors to the appointment of Renn Hampden as Bishop of Hereford. In 1849, a commission had been established to review the prohibition of marriage with a deceased wife's sister, a practice that was to remain unlawful in the United Kingdom until the Deceased Wife's Sister's Marriage Act 1907. Badeley made a submission, communicated by Edward Bouverie Pusey opposing any change in the law.

Gorham judgment
Badeley appeared for Henry Phillpotts, the Bishop of Exeter, before the Judicial Committee of the Privy Council when George Cornelius Gorham appealed against Phillpotts' refusal to confirm him in the benefice of Brampford Speke. The Privy Council overturned the bishop's ruling, confirming Gorham in his living, and were seen to impose secular over canon authority, causing a great scandal in some quarters. In the summer of 1850, Badeley, Henry Manning and 12 other prominent Anglicans called upon the Church of England to repudiate the views that the Privy Council had expressed on baptism. There was no response and Badeley was one of many when he joined the Roman Catholic Church in 1852.

Later life
Badeley was assistant counsel to Sir Alexander Cockburn in John Henry Newman's defence when he was prosecuted for libel by Giacinto Achilli in 1852. Badeley frequently advised Newman on legal matters thereafter, advising that Newman reject Charles Kingsley's partial withdrawal of his satirical jibe that Newman cared little for truth and encouraging him to write the Apologia Pro Vita Sua in response.

Much of his later practice concerned trusts and charities. In 1865, in the Constance Kent case, he argued, against settled opinion, that the principle of priest–penitent privilege applied in English law.

He maintained a lifelong friendship and correspondence with Hope-Scott and his family and Newman dedicated his Verses on Various Occasions to him as gratitude for his support in the Achilli trial. Badeley died on 29 March 1868 at his chambers at 13 Paper Buildings in the Inner Temple.

References

Bibliography

 
 
  The first edition of this text is available at Wikisource (see ).

Further reading

 

1800s births
1868 deaths
19th-century Anglicans
19th-century English lawyers
19th-century Roman Catholics
Alumni of Brasenose College, Oxford
Canon law of the Church of England
Converts to Roman Catholicism from Anglicanism
English Anglo-Catholics
English barristers
English Roman Catholics